The partridge pigeon (Geophaps smithii) is a species of bird in the family Columbidae.
It is endemic to Australia.

Its natural habitats are subtropical or tropical dry shrubland and subtropical or tropical dry lowland grassland.
It is threatened by habitat loss.

Taxonomy and systematics 
The partridge pigeon is one of three species in the genus Geophaps. Within the genus, the partridge pigeon is most closely related to the squatter pigeon, with these two species forming a clade that is sister to the spinifex pigeon. These three are most closely related to the crested pigeon.

Alternative names for the partridge pigeon include bare-eyed bronzewing, bare-eyed partridge bronzewing, and bare-eyed partridge pigeon.

Subspecies 
There are two subspecies, differing mainly in the colour of their orbital skin. The two subspecies are also sometimes treated as color morphs instead of races, making the species monotypic.

 G. s. smithii – Jardine and Selby, 1830: The nominate subspecies, it is found in extreme northeastern Western Australia and in north Northern Territory. 
 G. s. blauwii  – Mathews, 1912: It is found in northern Kimberley, in Western Australia.

References

partridge pigeon
Birds of the Northern Territory
Endemic birds of Australia
partridge pigeon
Taxonomy articles created by Polbot
Taxa named by Sir William Jardine
Taxa named by Prideaux John Selby